Azat-le-Ris (Limousin: Asac lo Riu) is a commune in the Haute-Vienne department in the Nouvelle-Aquitaine region in western France.

Geography
The Salleron has its source in the commune.

See also
Communes of the Haute-Vienne department

References

Communes of Haute-Vienne